NA-227 Jamshoro is a constituency for the National Assembly of Pakistan.

Members of Parliament

Since 2018: NA-233 Jamshoro

Election 2002 

General elections were held on 10 Oct 2002. Nawab Abdul Ghani Talpur of PPP won by 76,568 votes.

Election 2008 

General elections were held on 18 Feb 2008. Nawab Abdul Ghani Talpur of PPP won by 138,380 votes.

Election 2013 

General elections were held on 11 May 2013. Malik Asad Sikandar of PPP won by 129,500 votes and became the member of National Assembly.

Election 2018 

General elections were held on 25 July 2018.

See also
NA-226 Thatta
NA-228 Dadu-I

References

External links 
Election result's official website

NA-231